Bukoto is a township within the city of Kampala, Uganda's capital and largest metropolitan area.

Location
Bukoto is bordered by Kisaasi to the north, Kigoowa to the north-east, Ntinda to the east, Naguru to the south-east, Kololo to the south, Kamwookya to the west, and Kyebando to the north-west. The coordinates of Bukoto are 0°21'14.0"N, 32°35'47.0"E (Latitude:0.353889; Longitude:32.596389).

Points of interest
The following points of interest lie inside or near Bukoto:

1. The main branch of Pride Microfinance Limited, a Tier III Financial Institution, is located in Bukoto.

2. Watoto Church - An orphanage and place of worship affiliated with the Pentecostal Church

3. The Kampala Northern Bypass Highway - The highway passes through the northern reaches of Bukoto, in a west to east direction.

4. Women's Hospital International and Fertility Centre - A private hospital specializing in the care of infertile couples.

5. Kadic Hospital, a 30-bed privately owned healthcare facility, a member of Kadic Health Services Limited.

6. UMC Victoria Hospital, located along Kira Road, the hospital is a private tertiary care facility with 100 in-patient beds and modern amenities including surgical theatres, MRI, CT Scan, and  a Cardiac Catheterization Laboratory. This is in addition to regular services, including X-ray, ultrasound and regular medical laboratory services.

References

External links
 About Watoto Church

Neighborhoods of Kampala
Nakawa Division